The 1976 Pittsburgh Steelers season was the team's 44th in the National Football League. The team attempted to win their third consecutive Super Bowl championship, but ultimately lost to their bitter rivals, the Oakland Raiders, in the AFC Championship game. Despite failing to reach the Super Bowl, the 1976 Steelers are fondly remembered as one of the franchise's most dominant teams, thanks to a record-setting defense and running game. The Steelers' strong defense finished the season with just 9.9 points allowed per game, the fewest in the NFL, and a franchise record that still stands.

Season Summary 
The Steelers started the season looking to become the first team in the Super Bowl era to win three-straight league championships (and first since the 1929-1931 and 1965-1967 Green Bay Packers). However, many thought that would be in doubt after the team started 1–4 and saw quarterback Terry Bradshaw injured in the week 5 loss to the Cleveland Browns after a vicious sack by Joe "Turkey" Jones that has since become immortalized in NFL Films as part of the Browns-Steelers rivalry.

Despite the setbacks, behind the strength of the Steel Curtain defense and the dual threat of Franco Harris and Rocky Bleier at running back, the Steelers ended the season on a nine-game winning streak to finish 10-4 and win the AFC Central. Harris rushed for 1,128 yards and 14 touchdowns, while Bleier had the best season of his career with 1,036 rushing yards and five touchdowns. With both running backs rushing for over 1,000 yards, the Steelers became the second team in NFL history to have a 1,000 yard rushing duo (the first being the undefeated 1972 Miami Dolphins, the 1976 Steelers and the 1972 Dolphins are the only teams to accomplish this in a 14-game schedule). 

Meanwhile, led by linebacker Jack Lambert, the 1976 Defensive Player of the Year, the Steel Curtain had its most dominant season. The defense posted five shutouts, the most in a single season in the Super Bowl era; all five shutouts came during the team's nine-game winning streak. This included three consecutive shutouts (from Weeks 7-9), a 15-quarter shutout streak, and five consecutive games where the team didn't allow a touchdown (Weeks 6-10). During the winning streak, the team didn't allow a touchdown in eight games. Overall, the defense allowed just 138 points (including only 28 during the winning streak), forced 46 turnovers, and sent eight starting defensive players to the Pro Bowl, including the entire starting secondary.

Rookie quarterback Mike Kruczek wound up going 6–0 starting in place of Bradshaw, largely due to the strength of the ground game and defense. This would also stand as an NFL record for best start for a rookie quarterback until 2004—when the Steelers' own Ben Roethlisberger more than doubled that record and went 13–0 as a starter his rookie season.

However, injuries to both Bleier and Harris in the AFC Divisional Playoff game against the Baltimore Colts sidelined them both for the following week's AFC Championship game against the Oakland Raiders. Without both of their 1,000-yard rushers, the Steelers lost to the Raiders by a score of 24-7. Even with Pittsburgh coming up short, many Steelers fans—including the Rooney family themselves—consider the 1976 Steelers the best team in franchise history, even better than all six world championship teams. Jack Lambert, who won 4 Super Bowls with the Steelers between 1974 and 1979, claimed that the 1976 Steelers team was the best team that he ever played for, and subsequently, the loss to the Raiders in the AFC Championship game was the most painful loss of his career. He (Lambert) is convinced that they would have beaten the Raiders and gone on to win that season's Super Bowl had Harris and Bleier both been healthy and available for said AFC Championship game. Despite their opinions, the 1976 Steelers were not on the 100 greatest teams of all time presented by the NFL on its 100th anniversary.

In 2007, ESPN.com named the 1976 Steelers the greatest defense in NFL history, noting, "the 1976 unit was the best (slightly better than the '75 squad). Here's why: 28. That's how many points the Steel Curtain surrendered in the last nine games of the season. That's a total. As a result, Pittsburgh, which started the season 1–4, made it all the way to the AFC Championship Game. Only one of the seven teams the Steelers played during the streak finished the season with a winning record (Cincinnati) and none made the playoffs. However the defensive dominance did extend to the Divisional playoff with a resounding 40–14 defeat of the AFC East Champion Baltimore Colts. The Steelers' defense had Hall of Famers Mean Joe Greene, Jack Lambert, Jack Ham and Mel Blount. And eight Steelers defensive players made the 1976 Pro Bowl team: cornerback J.T. Thomas, defensive end L. C. Greenwood, Greene, Ham, Lambert, defensive back Glen Edwards, safety Mike Wagner, and Blount."

Personnel

Staff

Roster

Regular season

Schedule

Game summaries

Week 1: at Oakland Raiders

Week 2: vs. Cleveland Browns

Week 3: vs. New England Patriots

Week 4: at Minnesota Vikings

Week 5: at Cleveland Browns  

Terry Bradshaw was injured on a sack by Turkey Jones and missed six weeks.

Week 6: vs. Cincinnati Bengals

Week 7: at New York Giants

This was the first of five shoutout victories, and the second of a sequence of nine games conceding just two touchdowns.

Week 8: vs. San Diego Chargers

Week 9: at Kansas City Chiefs

Week 10: vs. Miami Dolphins

Week 11: vs. Houston Oilers

Week 12: at Cincinnati Bengals

Week 13: vs. Tampa Bay Buccaneers

Week 14: at Houston Oilers

With this win the Steelers record the most NFL shutouts in 50 years with their fifth and set a new NFL record forcing 71 punts in a season.

Standings

Postseason

Schedule

Game summaries

AFC Divisional Playoffs: at (2) Baltimore Colts

Pittsburgh gained a then-NFL record 524 total yards, but Franco Harris and Rocky Bleier were lost to injuries.

AFC Championship: at (1) Oakland Raiders

References

External links
 1976 Pittsburgh Steelers season at Profootballreference.com 
 1976 Pittsburgh Steelers season statistics at jt-sw.com 

Pittsburgh Steelers seasons
Pittsburgh Steelers
AFC Central championship seasons
Pittsburgh Steel